Telstar 11N is a communication satellite in the Telstar series of the Canadian satellite communications company Telesat.

References

Telstar satellites
Satellites using the SSL 1300 bus
Spacecraft launched in 2009
2009 in spaceflight
2009 in Canada